Inagaw na Bituin (International title: Written in the Stars / ) is a 2019 Philippine television drama musical series broadcast by GMA Network. Directed by Mark A. Reyes, it stars Kyline Alcantara and Therese Malvar. It premiered on February 11, 2019 on the network's Afternoon Prime line up replacing Ika-5 Utos. The series concluded on May 17, 2019 with a total of 68 episodes. It was replaced by Dahil sa Pag-ibig in its timeslot.

Originally titled as Kidnap, it was later renamed to Inagaw na Bituin. The series is streaming online on YouTube.

Premise
The relationship between Edward and Belinda will be put to a test after their only daughter, Anna, is kidnapped. With the loss of their real daughter, they will focus their attention and love on their niece, Ariela. While Anna will grow up as Elsa with Aurora. Due to music, their families will cross paths.

Cast and characters

Lead cast
 Kyline Alcantara as Anna Lopez Sevilla
 Therese Malvar as Ariela Lopez Sevilla

Supporting cast
 Sunshine Dizon as Belinda Lopez vda. de Sevilla
 Angelika Dela Cruz as Lucinda "Lucy" Lopez
 Marvin Agustin as Edward Sevilla
 Angelu de Leon as Aurora "Auring" Mendoza vda. de Dela Cruz
 Gabby Eigenmann as George Del Mundo
 Jackie Lou Blanco as Regina Lopez
 Manolo Pedrosa as Prince Antonio
 Renz Valerio as Philip Henry Bautista
 Melbelline Caluag as Melody M. Dela Cruz
 Patricia Tumulak as Queenie Belardo
 Yana Asistio as Christiana "Tiana" Pablo
Guest cast
 Michael Flores as Enrique "Iking" Dela Cruz
 Ramon Christopher Gutierrez as Wolfgang Garcia
 Ashley Cabrera as young Anna
 Jazz Yburan as young Ariela
 Dayara Shane as young Lucy
 Lynn Ynchausti-Cruz as Socorro Dela Cruz
 Patricia Ysmael as Tasya
 Maritess Joaquin as Mina
 André Paras as a singing competition host
 Rich Asuncion as Kaye
 Garrett Bolden as a singing competition judge
 Danielle Ozaraga as Daniele Mae Clemente
 Shyr Valdez as Fiona
 Cheche Tolentino as Diana
 Sandy Tolentino as Gisela
 Mia Pangyarihan as Porshie
 Aleera Montalla as Ces
 Arrian Labios as Gorio

Production
Migo Adecer was initially hired to portray as Prince Antonio. Adecer later left during pre-production due to joining the drama series, Sahaya. Manolo Pedrosa served as his replacement.

References

External links
 
 

2019 Philippine television series debuts
2019 Philippine television series endings
Filipino-language television shows
GMA Network drama series
Philippine musical television series
Television shows set in the Philippines